The 1929–30 UCLA Bruins men's basketball team represented the University of California, Los Angeles during the 1929–30 NCAA men's basketball season and were members of the Pacific Coast Conference. The Bruins were led by ninth year head coach Caddy Works. They finished the regular season with a record of 14–8 and were third in the southern division with a record of 3–6.

Previous season

The Bruins finished the season 7–9 overall and were fourth in the PCC south division with a record of 1–8.

Roster

Schedule

|-
!colspan=9 style=|Regular Season

Source:

References

UCLA Bruins men's basketball seasons
Ucla
UCLA Bruins Basketball
UCLA Bruins Basketball